Brigitte Schwack is a former West German slalom canoeist who competed in the 1960s.

She won a gold medal in the K-1 team event at the 1969 ICF Canoe Slalom World Championships in Bourg St.-Maurice.

References
Overview of athlete's results at canoeslalom.net

West German female canoeists
Possibly living people
Year of birth missing (living people)
Medalists at the ICF Canoe Slalom World Championships